Piel de Niña is the second album recorded by Mexican singer Alejandro Fernández, this is an album with a romantic cut produced by Pedro Ramírez. He made a video for the song "Piel De Niña". Other songs known from this album are "Cascos Ligeros", "Acabe Por Llorar" and "A La Vera Del Camino".

Track listing
 "Piel De Niña"  – 2:41
 "No Estoy Triste"  – 2:55
 "Acabe Por Llorar"  – 2:50
 "Cenizas"  – 3:49
 "A La Vera Del Camino"  – 3:42
 "Cascos Ligeros"  – 2:06
 "Hasta Dondes Estes"  – 3:19
 "Mentira, Mentira"  – 2:55
 "Cuando Te Olvide"  – 2:20
 "Quisiera Olvidarme De Ti"  – 3:03
 "Contigo Aprendi"  – 3:25
 "Si No Eres Tu"  – 3:01

Chart performance

Album

Singles

References

1993 albums
Alejandro Fernández albums